In some areas of Switzerland (Berner Oberland or Graubünden) a Bäuert is a small farming community.  It is a type of agricultural cooperative with shared equipment and land.

References

Cooperatives in Switzerland
Local government in Switzerland